Muhammad Sajid Ahmad (born 19 January 1980) is a Pakistani sprinter. He competed in the men's 400 metres at the 2004 Summer Olympics.

References

External links

1980 births
Living people
Athletes (track and field) at the 2004 Summer Olympics
Pakistani male sprinters
Olympic athletes of Pakistan
Place of birth missing (living people)